The TB-001, nicknamed "Twin-Tailed Scorpion", is a medium-altitude long-endurance (MALE) unmanned combat aerial vehicle (UCAV) designed by Sichuan Tengden. It is used by the People's Liberation Army.

Development
The TB-001 was first unveiled in September 2017.

In 2020, the three-engined variant of the TB-001 was unveiled, reportedly taking less than six months to develop.

Design
The UAV uses a twin-boom design similar to that of the Lockheed P-38 Lightning fighter.

It has a pair of turbocharged-piston engines, each driving a three-bladed propeller on either side of the central fuselage, underneath a straight high-mounted wing.

Variants 
TB-001:
Base variant.

TB-001A:
Developed from the original TB-001. Upgraded with an additional engine on the tail. Takeoff distance is shortened to 500 metres and has maximum rate of climb of over 10 metres per second. The maximum flight endurance is 35 hours, the same as TB-001.

Service history
In August 2021, the TB-001 was twice spotted in the East China Sea by the Japan Maritime Self-Defense Force. In the first encounter, the TB-001 flew over the East China Sea unaccompanied, and in the second encounter it flew through the Miyako Strait alongside two Shaanxi Y-9 aircraft.

Operators

Specifications

See also

References

2000s Chinese military aircraft
2010s Chinese military aircraft
Medium-altitude long-endurance unmanned aerial vehicles
People's Liberation Army Navy
Twin-boom aircraft
Unmanned military aircraft of China